The 2019 season is the 90th season of the Liga Melaka, which is a Malaysian football competition featuring semi-professional and amateur clubs from Malacca. It is a part of Malaysia M4 League. SAMB are the defending champions.

Division 1

Group A

Group B

Knock-out stage

Bracket

Semi-finals

Final

Division 2

Group A

Group B

Knock-out stage

Bracket

Quarter-finals

Semi-finals

Final

Division 3

Group A

Group B

Group C

Group D

Knock-out stage

Bracket

Quarter-finals

Semi-finals

Final

References

External links
 Official Website

4
Malay
Liga Melaka